Great Neck Gardens (also known as Allenwood) is a hamlet and census-designated place (CDP) located on the Great Neck Peninsula in Nassau County, on the North Shore of Long Island, New York, United States. The population was 1,186 at the 2010 census. As an unincorporated hamlet, it is governed by the Town of North Hempstead.

The hamlet's name is rarely used in part because of how the area was never incorporated.

History 
The Great Neck Gardens CDP was first created for the 2000 United States Census.

Like the rest of the Great Neck Peninsula, this area was historically known as Madnan's Neck.

The Allen family was one of the first European families to settle in the Great Neck area. They owned large portions of property (including farms) now located within modern-day Great Neck Gardens.

Geography

Demographics

As of the census of 2000, there were 1,089 people, 376 households, and 327 families residing in the CDP. The population density was 6,467.8 per square mile (2,473.3/km2). There were 381 housing units at an average density of 2,262.8/sq mi (865.3/km2). The racial makeup of the CDP was 89.35% White, 0.83% African American, 7.44% Asian, 0.73% from other races, and 1.65% from two or more races. Hispanic or Latino of any race were 2.30% of the population.

There were 376 households, out of which 41.2% had children under the age of 18 living with them, 79.5% were married couples living together, 6.6% had a female householder with no husband present, and 13.0% were non-families. 12.2% of all households were made up of individuals, and 8.8% had someone living alone who was 65 years of age or older. The average household size was 2.90 and the average family size was 3.11.

In the CDP, the population was spread out, with 28.3% under the age of 18, 3.8% from 18 to 24, 21.2% from 25 to 44, 30.4% from 45 to 64, and 16.3% who were 65 years of age or older. The median age was 42 years. For every 100 females, there were 103.2 males. For every 100 females age 18 and over, there were 95.3 males.

The median income for a household in the CDP was $124,175, and the median income for a family was $142,915. Males had a median income of $94,401 versus $56,071 for females. The per capita income for the CDP was $49,317. None of the population or families were below the poverty line.

Government

Town representation 
As Great Neck Gardens is an unincorporated hamlet, it has no government of its own, and is instead governed directly by the Town of North Hempstead's government in Manhasset.

As of June 2021, Great Neck Gardens is represented on the Town Board by Veronica Lurvey, and is located in its 4th Council District.

Representation in higher government

Nassau County representation 
Great Neck Gardens is located in Nassau County's 10th Legislative district, which as of January 2023 is represented in the Nassau County Legislature by Mazi Melesa Pilip (R–Great Neck).

New York State representation

New York State Assembly 
Great Neck Gardens is located in the New York State Assembly's 16th Assembly district, which as of September 2021 is represented by Gina Sillitti (D–Manorhaven).

New York State Senate 
Great Neck Gardens is located in the New York State Senate's 7th State Senate district, which as of September 2021 is represented in the New York State Senate by Anna Kaplan (D–North Hills).

Federal representation

United States Congress 
Great Neck Gardens is located in New York's 3rd congressional district, which as of September 2021 is represented in the United States Congress by Tom Suozzi (D–Glen Cove).

United States Senate 
Like the rest of New York, Great Neck Gardens is represented in the United States Senate by Charles Schumer (D) and Kirsten Gillibrand (D).

Politics 
In the 2016 U.S. presidential election, the majority of Great Neck Gardens voters voted for Hillary Clinton (D).

Parks & recreation 

 Allenwood Park – A major park located in the southern part of the hamlet operated by the Great Neck Park District, which Great Neck gardens is located within.

References

Great Neck Peninsula
Town of North Hempstead, New York
Census-designated places in New York (state)
Hamlets in New York (state)
Census-designated places in Nassau County, New York
Hamlets in Nassau County, New York